John Wilcotes (died 1422), of Great Tew, Oxfordshire, was an English politician.

Family
Wilcotes is thought to have been a younger brother of William Wilcotes. John married a woman named Alice, circa 1396. She was probably a widow from Chelmscote of Great Tew. She died in 1410. Wilcote's second wife was Elizabeth Cheyne, daughter of Richard Cheyne of Shurland, Isle of Sheppey, Kent, and Margery Cralle of Cralle, Sussex, a sister of William Cheyne. The Cheynes were a prominent Kentish family. Elizabeth was also a widow, having previously been married to Sir William Septvance of Milton near Canterbury. He had died in 1407. They had two daughters, and he had an illegitimate son, Thomas Wilcotes.

Career
Wilcotes was a Member of Parliament for Oxfordshire in 1399, 1401, October 1404, 1406, 1407, May 1413, April 1414, November 1414, 1417, 1419 and May 1421. He was an MP for Kent March 1416.

He was appointed High Sheriff of Oxfordshire and Berkshire for 1402, 1408, 1416, 1420 and from May 1422 to his death later that year. He also served as High Sheriff of Gloucestershire from November 1420 to May 1422.

He was appointed receiver-general of the Duchy of Cornwall, steward of the duchy's Devon estates and Warden of the Stannaries for Devon from 2 April 1413 to his death.

References

Year of birth missing
1422 deaths
14th-century births
English MPs 1399
English MPs 1401
High Sheriffs of Berkshire
High Sheriffs of Oxfordshire
People from Oxfordshire
English MPs October 1404
English MPs 1406
English MPs 1407
English MPs May 1413
English MPs April 1414
English MPs March 1416
English MPs 1417
English MPs 1419
English MPs May 1421